Osypenko or Osipenko is a Ukrainian surname derived from the given name Osyp, equivalent to English Joseph. Its Belarusian equivalent is Asipenka or Asipienka.

Notable people with the surname include:
 Alexander Osipenko (disambiguation), multiple individuals
 Alla Osipenko (born 1932), Russian ballerina
 Dzmitry Asipenka (born 1982), Belarusian footballer
 Inna Osypenko-Radomska (born 1982), Ukrainian-Azerbaijani sprint kayaker
 Petro Osypenko (1921–unknown), Soviet-Ukrainian public prosecutor
 Polina Osipenko (1907–1939), Soviet-Ukrainian pilot

See also
 

Ukrainian-language surnames
Patronymic surnames
Surnames from given names